Foothills Christian Schools (FCS) is a private Christian school network in San Diego County, California, covering grades preschool-12.

Schools
Schools in the network:
 Foothills Christian Preschool - El Cajon
 Foothills Christian School (K-5) - Lakeside
 Foothills Christian Middle School - El Cajon
 Foothills Christian High School - El Cajon

Athletics
Basketball coach Brad Leaf has coached the Foothills Christian High School boys basketball team to seven titles through 2020. In 2016 he was named California Interscholastic Federation Coach of the Year.

In basketball, T. J. Leaf attended the school, and played basketball under his father. As a junior, Leaf led Foothills Christian to the San Diego Section Division II championship. Cal-Hi Sports named him their Division II State Player of the Year. In his senior year, Leaf led the team to a No. 3 state ranking. Leaf finished his high school career second all-time in the San Diego Section in both points (3,022) and rebounds (1,476).

Notable alumni

Jaylen Hands, NBA G League basketball player
T. J. Leaf, Israeli-American NBA basketball player for the Indiana Pacers

Notable faculty
Brad Leaf, American-Israeli basketball player for Hapoel Galil Elyon and Maccabi Tel Aviv of the Israel Premier League, coach

References

External links
 Foothills Christian Schools

Christian schools in California
Private elementary schools in California
Private middle schools in California
Private high schools in California
Education in El Cajon, California
High schools in San Diego County, California
Schools in San Diego County, California